Robert Thompson (1840 – 21 April 1922) was a Member of Parliament for Marsden, in Northland, New Zealand.

Early life
Born at Newtownbutler, County Fermanagh, Thompson migrated to New South Wales in 1864, and New Zealand in 1870. He was a commission agent and auctioneer in Whangarei.

He married Mary Catherine Aubrey, eldest daughter of Harcourt Richard Aubrey, Resident Magistrate for Kaipara and Whangarei, in 1879.

Member of Parliament

He acquired the labels 'Marsden Thompson' and 'the member for roads and bridges' in Parliament. He was known for his devotion to the interests of his district, which was desperately in need of good roads, and his only reason for being a Liberal was that the government was the only source of funding for roads and bridges. He was pro-freehold (land), and was opposed to Liberal policies such as labour legislation and old age pensions. In , when he stood unsuccessfully for Auckland West against a sitting Liberal member, he was once more an Independent, and his programme – freehold (land), acquisition of Maori land and opposition to prohibition had not altered.

Death
He died on 21 April 1922 at his residence, Pentland House, in Whangarei, and was buried at Kamo. His wife had died some 18 years before him. He was survived by one daughter.

References 

1840 births
1922 deaths
Date of birth unknown
Independent MPs of New Zealand
Members of the New Zealand House of Representatives
Local politicians in New Zealand
Irish emigrants to New Zealand (before 1923)
New Zealand businesspeople
New Zealand farmers
New Zealand Liberal Party MPs
People from County Fermanagh
Unsuccessful candidates in the 1902 New Zealand general election
Unsuccessful candidates in the 1905 New Zealand general election
Unsuccessful candidates in the 1908 New Zealand general election
New Zealand auctioneers
New Zealand MPs for North Island electorates
19th-century New Zealand politicians
Irish expatriates in Australia